Anton Sergeyevich Kokorin (born April 5, 1987 in Tashkent, Uzbek SSR) is a Russian sprint athlete. Anton was part of the team that finished third in Men's 4x400 m relay at the 2008 Summer Olympics, but the team was disqualified after team mate Denis Alekseyev tested positive for doping.

References

External links
Athlete bio at 2008 Olympics website

1987 births
Living people
Russian male sprinters
Athletes (track and field) at the 2008 Summer Olympics
Olympic athletes of Russia
Sportspeople from Tashkent
Competitors stripped of Summer Olympics medals
21st-century Russian people